Bernard Schröter (born 10 April 1934) is a German boxer. He competed in the men's featherweight event at the 1956 Summer Olympics.

References

1934 births
Living people
German male boxers
Olympic boxers of the United Team of Germany
Boxers at the 1956 Summer Olympics
Place of birth missing (living people)
Featherweight boxers